Alfred Hitchcock's Anthology – Volume 2 is the second installment in the Alfred Hitchcock's Anthology series. Originally published in hardcover as Alfred Hitchcock's Tales to Take Your Breath Away in 1977, this issue contains 29 stories from Alfred Hitchcock's Mystery Magazine that, by the editors, were believed to be the best published the preceding year (1977).

References

1977 anthologies
Mystery anthologies
Works originally published in Alfred Hitchcock's Mystery Magazine
Dial Press books